The men's 1500 metre freestyle event at the 2001 World Aquatics Championships took place 29 July. The heats took place 28 July, while the final was held on 29 July.

In the final, Australian swimmer Grant Hackett broke the world record with a time of 14:34.56, bettering the previous record held by his compatriot Kieren Perkins by seven seconds. This record would stand for a decade until Chinese swimmer Sun Yang broke it at the 2011 World Aquatics Championships and at the time, it was the oldest world record in swimming.

Records
Prior to the competition, the existing world and championship records were as follows.

The following record was established during the competition:

Results

Heats

Final

Key: WR = World record

References

External links
Results from swimrankings.net Retrieved 2012-08-18

Swimming at the 2001 World Aquatics Championships